King of Nothing is the second studio album by American country music duo The Warren Brothers. It was released in September 2000 via BNA Records. The album includes the singles "That's the Beat of a Heart," "Move On" and "Where Does It Hurt." "That's the Beat of a Heart" features guest vocals from Sara Evans, and was previously released on the soundtrack to the 2000 film Where the Heart Is. "Move On" is the brothers' highest-peaking single, reaching number 17 on the Billboard Hot Country Songs charts.

The Warren Brothers produced the album with Chris Farren, except for the title track, which was produced by Jay Joyce.

Track listing

Personnel
Compiled from liner notes.

Musicians
The Warren Brothers
 Brad Warren — harmony vocals, electric guitar, acoustic guitar
 Brett Warren — lead vocals, acoustic guitar, harmonica, mandolin, piano
The Warren Brothers' band
 Angelo Collura — drums, percussion
 Mike Holder — pedal steel guitar, lap steel guitar, Dobro, background vocals
 Marty McIntosh — bass guitar, background vocals
 Rob Stoney — piano, Hammond B-3 organ, Wurlitzer electric piano
Additional musicians
 Bruce Bouton — pedal steel guitar, lap steel guitar
 Stephen E. Byam — pedal steel guitar, lap steel guitar
 Sara Evans — background vocals on "That's the Beat of a Heart"
 Chris Farren — background vocals
 Larry Franklin — fiddle
 Tony Harrell — keyboards, synthesizer strings
 John Hobbs — keyboards
 Jennie Hoeft — drums
 Chris McHugh — drums, percussion
 Greg Morrow — drums, percussion
 LeAnn Phelan — background vocals
 Nashville String Machine — strings
 Steve Nathan — synthesizer strings
 Darrell Scott — mandolin
 Benmont Tench — keyboards

Technical
 Richard Dodd — mixing ("King of Nothing" only)
 Chris Farren — production (except "King of Nothing")
 Ben Fowler — mixing (all tracks except "King of Nothing")
 Jay Joyce — production ("King of Nothing" only)
 Chris Lord-Alge — mixing (except "That's the Beat of a Heart")
 Steve Marcantonio — recording (except "King of Nothing"), mixing (except "That's the Beat of a Heart")
 Denny Purcell — mastering
 Giles Reaves — recording ("King of Nothing" only)
 The Warren Brothers — production (except "King of Nothing")

Chart performance

References

2000 albums
BNA Records albums
The Warren Brothers albums
Albums produced by Chris Farren (country musician)